Presquille is an unincorporated community and census-designated place in Terrebonne Parish, Louisiana, United States. Its population was 1,807 as of the 2010 census. Louisiana Highway 24 passes through the community.

Geography

Demographics

References

Unincorporated communities in Terrebonne Parish, Louisiana
Unincorporated communities in Louisiana
Census-designated places in Terrebonne Parish, Louisiana
Census-designated places in Louisiana